Virginia Question 1 may refer to:

 2006 Virginia Question 1, a ballot question to prohibit same-sex marriage
 2020 Virginia Question 1, a ballot question to change the congressional redistricting process